Kilham can refer to:

Places
Kilham, East Riding of Yorkshire, a village in England
Kilham, Northumberland, a village in England

People
Chris Kilham, writer on Tibet 
Alexander Kilham (1762–1798), English Methodist minister
Hannah Kilham (1774–1832), Methodist and Quaker, wife of Alexander Kilham, known as a missionary and linguist 
Lawrence Kilham (1910–2000), American virologist and nature writer
Susan Kilham (1943—2022), American ecologist